The Bærum Waldorf School (lit. "The Steiner School in Bærum") is a private school in the Norwegian municipality of Bærum, a suburb west of Oslo.

It is located in the borough of Jar, occupying the former agricultural property Grav. Hence, it is unofficially also referred to as Grav or the Grav Waldorf School (Steinerskolen på Grav). The school was established in August 1971, and is both an elementary and a secondary school, leading to the student exam. It was the second waldorf school to be established in the Oslo area (there are also three waldorf schools in Oslo and four other waldorf schools in Akershus.)

The school has been attended by, among others, Maud Angelica Behn.

References

External links
Bærum Waldorf School

Waldorf schools in Norway
Primary schools in Norway
Secondary schools in Norway
Education in Bærum
Educational institutions established in 1971
1971 establishments in Norway